Prince of Wales Bridge may refer to:

Prince of Wales Bridge, re-named Chief William Commanda Bridge, a rail bridge between Ottawa, Ontario and Gatineau, Quebec in Canada
Prince of Wales Bridge, formerly known as the Second Severn Crossing, a road bridge that carries the M4 motorway between England and Wales